Francisco Ramírez (died 1564) was a Roman Catholic prelate who served as Bishop of Cuzco (1562–1564).

Biography
On 6 Jul 1562, Antonio de Raya Navarrete was appointed during the papacy of Pope Pius IV as Bishop of Cusco. He served as Bishop of Cusco until his death in 1564.

References

External links and additional sources
 (for Chronology of Bishops) 
 (for Chronology of Bishops) 

1564 deaths
16th-century Roman Catholic bishops in Peru
Bishops appointed by Pope Pius IV
Roman Catholic bishops of Cusco